Events in the year 1932 in Bulgaria.

Incumbents 
Monarch – Boris III

Events 

 The Varna Aquarium was unveiled to the public.

Sports 

 FC Lokomotiv Gorna Oryahovitsa, a Bulgarian association football club based in Gorna Oryahovitsa, was founded.

References 

 
1930s in Bulgaria
Years of the 20th century in Bulgaria
Bulgaria
Bulgaria